Shady Rest is an unincorporated community in Warren County, in the U.S. state of Tennessee.

History
The community was named from the presence of the Shady Rest Tourist Court.

References

Unincorporated communities in Warren County, Tennessee
Unincorporated communities in Tennessee